The United States Air Force and its predecessors include a number of specialized Air Force Squadrons. These units vary widely in size and may include several hundred enlisted airmen commanded by an officer in the rank of captain to lieutenant colonel. A squadron may include two or three subordinate flights. In turn the squadron may be part of a group and then a wing.  

An Air Force squadron is the basic unit of the service and may carry the linage and honors of units over a century ago.

United States Army Air Service
 Aero Squadrons
 Balloon Squadrons

United States Army Air Corps/United States Army Air Force

United States Air Force

 Aerial Port
 Aerial Target
 Aeromedical Evacuation
 Aggressor
 Air Base
 Airborne Air Control
 Airborne Command and Control
 Aircraft Control and Warning
 Aircraft Sustainment
 Air Control
 Air Defense
 Airlift
 Air Operations
 Air Refueling
 Air Support Operations
 Attack
 Bomb
 Civil Engineering
 Combat Camera
 Combat Communications
 Combat Operations
 Communications
 Comptroller
 Defense Systems Evaluation
 Electronic Combat
 Electronic Systems
 Electronic Warfare
 Field Investigative
 Fighter Squadrons
 Ground Observer
 Helicopter
 Information Operations
 Intelligence
 Missile
 Munitions
 Network
 Operational Weather
 Operations
 Operations Support
 Presidential Airlift
 Prime BEEF
 Radar
 Reconnaissance
 Recruiting
 RED HORSE
 Rescue
 Security Forces
 Special Operations
 Special Tactics
 Support
 Technical Operations
 Test
 Test and Evaluation
 Training
 USAF Air Demonstration
 Weapons
 Weather
 Weather Reconnaissance

See also
 List of active United States Air Force aircraft squadrons
 List of USAAF squadron codes, as used in Europe during World War II

References